Samir Zeljković (born 4 September 1997) is a Bosnian professional footballer who plays as a defensive midfielder for Bosnian Premier League club Velež Mostar.

Club career
Zeljković made his professional debut in the Bosnian Premier League for Velež Mostar on 20 July 2019, starting in a 1–3 home loss against Mladost Doboj Kakanj.

International career
In October 2020, Zeljković was called up to represent the Bosnia and Herzegovina national team, for a friendly game against Iran and for the 2020–21 UEFA Nations League games against Netherlands and Italy.

Honours
Velež Mostar
Bosnian Cup: 2021–22
First League of FBiH: 2018–19

References

External links

1997 births
Living people
Footballers from Sarajevo
Bosnia and Herzegovina footballers
Association football midfielders
NK TOŠK Tešanj players
FK Igman Konjic players
FK Velež Mostar players
Premier League of Bosnia and Herzegovina players
First League of the Federation of Bosnia and Herzegovina players